The Broadview Anthology of Poetry is a 1993 poetry anthology compiled by Canadian academics Herbert Rosengarten and Amanda Goldrick-Jones.

It states the aim of including a 'wide range' of poetry in English, with the aim of being representative geographically and in other ways (in particular the inclusion of women). Within that brief it tries to be representative also of each of American poetry, British poetry and Canadian poetry.

Poets in The Broadview Anthology of Poetry

Fleur Adcock
Maya Angelou
Matthew Arnold
Margaret Atwood
W. H. Auden
Margaret Avison
Kofi Awoonor
Imamu Amiri Baraka
Anna Laetitia Barbauld
James K. Baxter
Aphra Behn
John Berryman
Earle Birney
Elizabeth Bishop
William Blake
George Bowering
Anne Bradstreet
Dionne Brand
Edward K. Brathwaite
Emily Brontë
Elizabeth Barrett Browning
Robert Browning
Basil Bunting
Robert Burns
Thomas Campion
Bliss Carman
Lewis Carroll
Margaret Cavendish, Duchess of Newcastle
Geoffrey Chaucer
Lady Mary Chudleigh
Arthur Hugh Clough
Leonard Cohen
Wanda Coleman
Samuel Taylor Coleridge
Jeni Couzyn
William Cowper
Isabella Valancy Crawford
Robert Creeley
Countee Cullen
E. E. Cummings
Allen Curnow
Emily Dickinson
H. D.
John Donne
John Dryden
Richard Eberhart
T. S. Eliot
Ralph Waldo Emerson
Nissim Ezekiel
Anne Finch, Countess of Winchilsea
Robert Frost
Allen Ginsberg
George Gordon, Lord Byron
Robert Graves
Thomas Gray
Thomas Hardy
Seamus Heaney
George Herbert
Robert Herrick
Daryl Hine
A. D. Hope
Gerard Manley Hopkins
A. E. Housman
Henry Howard, Earl of Surrey
Langston Hughes
Ted Hughes
Randall Jarrell
Ben Jonson
John Keats
Rudyard Kipling
Carolyn Kizer
A. M. Klein
Archibald Lampman
Patrick Lane
Philip Larkin
D. H. Lawrence
Irving Layton
Mary Leapor
Dennis Lee
Douglas LePan
Denise Levertov
Dorothy Livesay
Henry Wadsworth Longfellow
Audre Lorde
Robert Lowell
Hugh MacDiarmid
Gwendolyn MacEwen
Kenneth Mackenzie
Archibald MacLeish
Louis MacNeice
Jay Macpherson
Daphne Marlatt
Christopher Marlowe
Andrew Marvell
Herman Melville
James Merrill
Edna St. Vincent Millay
John Milton
Lady Mary Wortley Montagu
Marianne Moore
Susan Musgrave
Arthur Nortje
Alden Nowlan
Michael Ondaatje
Wilfred Owen
P. K. Page
Dorothy Parker
Katherine Philips
Marge Piercy
Sylvia Plath
Edgar Allan Poe
Alexander Pope
Peter Porter
Ezra Pound
E. J. Pratt
Al Purdy
Sir Walter Raleigh
John Crowe Ransom
Henry Reed
Adrienne Rich
Charles G. D. Roberts
Judith Rodriguez
Theodore Roethke
Christina Rossetti
Dante Gabriel Rossetti
Siegfried Sassoon
Duncan Scott Campbell
F. R. Scott
Robert W. Service
Anne Sexton
William Shakespeare
Percy Bysshe Shelley
Sir Philip Sidney
Edith Sitwell
Kenneth Slessor
Christopher Smart
Stevie Smith
A. J. M. Smith
W. D. Snodgrass
Raymond Souster
Stephen Spender
Edmund Spenser
William Stafford
Wallace Stevens
Jonathan Swift
Alfred, Lord Tennyson
Sharon Thesen
Dylan Thomas
Maxine Tynes
Miriam Waddington
Derek Walcott
Tom Wayman
Phyllis Webb
Walt Whitman
Richard Wilbur
Anne Wilkinson
William Carlos Williams
William Wordsworth
Judith Wright
Lady Mary Wroth
Sir Thomas Wyatt
William Butler Yeats
Patricia Young

See also
 1993 in poetry
 1993 in literature
 American poetry
 Canadian poetry
 English poetry
 List of poetry anthologies

1993 poetry books
1993 anthologies
Canadian poetry anthologies